The Government of the People's Republic of China is an authoritarian one-party political system in the People's Republic of China under the exclusive political leadership of the Chinese Communist Party (CCP). It consists of legislative, executive, military, supervisory, judicial, and procuratorial branches. The constitutional head of government is the premier, while the de facto top leader of government is the CCP general secretary.

On the relationship between the government and the CCP, James Palmer, writing for Foreign Policy, states that, "[t]he Chinese government is essentially the shadow of the Communist Party, moving as the party does, and consequently government roles matter far less than party ones." According to The Economist, "[e]specially when meeting foreigners, officials may present name cards bearing government titles but stay quiet about party positions which may or may not outrank their state jobs." According to scholar Rush Doshi, "[t]he Party sits above the state, runs parallel to the state, and is enmeshed in every level of the state."

The National People's Congress (NPC) is the highest state organ, with control over the constitution and basic laws, as well as over the election and supervision of officials of other government organs. The congress meets annually for about two weeks in March to review and approve major new policy directions, laws, the budget, and major personnel changes. The NPC's Standing Committee (NPCSC) is the permanent legislative organ that adopts most national legislation, interprets the constitution and laws, and conducts constitutional reviews. The President acts as a head of state in compliance with decisions made by the NPCSC, but exercises an independent power to nominate the premier. Elected separately by the NPC, the Vice-president has no power themselves, but assists the President.

The State Council, also referred to as the Central People's Government, is China's executive organ headed by the Premier of China. Besides the Premier, the State Council has a variable number of Vice Premiers, five State Councilors (protocol equal of vice premiers but with narrower portfolios), the Secretary-General, and 26 ministers and other cabinet-level department heads. It consists of ministries and agencies with specific portfolios. The State Council presents most initiatives to the NPCSC for consideration after previous endorsement by the CCP's Politburo Standing Committee, which is headed by the CCP general secretary. The NPC generally approves State Council policy, although will occasionally force revisions in proposed laws.

China's judicial organs perform prosecutorial and court functions. China's courts are supervised by the Supreme People's Court (SPC), which is headed by the Chief Justice. The Supreme People's Procuratorate (SPP) is responsible for prosecutions and supervises procuracies at the provincial, prefecture, and county levels. At the same administrative ranking as the SPC and SPP, the National Supervisory Commission (NSC) was established in 2018 to investigate corruption within the CCP and state organs.

During the 1980s there was an attempt made to separate CCP and state functions, with the former deciding general policy and the latter carrying it out. The attempt was abandoned in the 1990s with the result that the political leadership within the state are also the leaders of the CCP.

Constitution 

The Chinese Constitution was first created on 20 September 1954, before which an interim constitution-like document created by the Chinese People's Political Consultative Conference was in force. The second promulgation in 1975 shortened the Constitution to just about 30 articles, containing Communist slogans and revolutionary language throughout. The role of courts was slashed, and the Presidency was gone. The 3rd promulgation in 1978 expanded the number of articles, but was still under the influence of the very-recent Cultural Revolution.

The current constitution is the PRC's fourth promulgation, declared on 4 December 1982, and has served as a stable constitution for 30 years. The legal power of the CCP is guaranteed by the PRC Constitution and its position as the supreme political authority in the People's Republic of China is put in practice through its comprehensive control of the state, military, and media.

National People's Congress

The National People's Congress (NPC) is the national legislature of the People's Republic of China. With 2,924 members in 2017, it is the largest parliamentary body in the world. Under China's current Constitution, the NPC is structured as a unicameral legislature, with the power to legislate, to oversee the operations of the government, and to elect the major officials of state. Its delegates are elected for a five-year term through a multi-tiered electoral system.  The NPC and the National Committee of the People's Political Consultative Conference (CPPCC), a consultative body whose members represent various social groups, are the main deliberative bodies of China, and are often referred to as the Lianghui ('Two Sessions').

The NPC, elected for a term of five years, holds annual sessions every spring, usually lasting from 10 to 14 days, in the Great Hall of the People on the west side of Tiananmen Square, Beijing. These annual meetings are usually timed to occur with the meetings of the CPPCC, providing an opportunity for the officers of state to review past policies and present future plans to the nation. The fourth session of the 12th NPC was held from 5 to 16 March 2016.

The NPC generally has a reputation of approving the work of the State Council and not engaging in overmuch drafting of laws itself.  However, it and its Standing Committee do occasionally assert themselves. For example, the State Council and the CCP were unable to secure passage of a fuel tax in 2009 to finance the construction of expressways.

Leadership

National leadership 

 

The CCP Politburo Standing Committee consists of the government's top leadership. Historically it has had five to nine members, and currently has seven members. Its officially mandated purpose is to conduct policy discussions and make decisions on major issues when the Politburo, a larger decision-making body, is not in session. According to the CCP's Constitution, the General Secretary of the Central Committee must also be a member of the CCP Politburo Standing Committee.

The membership of the PSC is strictly ranked in protocol sequence. Historically, the general secretary (or party chairman) has been ranked first; the rankings of other leaders have varied over time. Since the 1990s, the general secretary (also the president), premier, chairman of the NPC Standing Committee, the chairman of the Chinese People's Political Consultative Conference, the secretary of the Central Commission for Discipline Inspection, the party's top anti-graft body, and the first-ranked secretary of the CCP secretariat have consistently also been members of the Politburo Standing Committee.

Paramount leader 

Power is concentrated in the "paramount leader," an informal title currently occupied by Xi Jinping, who heads the four most important political and state offices: He is the general secretary of the CCP Central Committee, Chairman of the Central Military Commission, and President of the PRC. Near the end of Hu Jintao's term in office, experts observed growing limitations to the paramount leader's de facto control over the government, but at the 19th Party Congress in October 2017, Xi Jinping's term limits were removed and his powers were expanded considerably.

President 

The President of the People's Republic of China is the head of state. Under the PRC's constitution, the presidency is a largely ceremonial office with limited powers. However, since 1993, as a matter of convention, the presidency has been held simultaneously by the General Secretary of the Chinese Communist Party, the top leader in the one-party system. The office is officially regarded as an institution of the state rather than an administrative post; theoretically, the president serves at the pleasure of the National People's Congress, the legislature, and is not legally vested to take executive action on its own prerogative. The current president is Xi Jinping, who took office in March 2013.

The office was first established in the Constitution of the People's Republic of China in 1954 and successively held by Mao Zedong and Liu Shaoqi. Liu fell into political disgrace during the Cultural Revolution, after which the office became vacant. The office was abolished under the Constitution of 1975, then reinstated in the Constitution of 1982, but with reduced powers. The official English-language translation of the title was "Chairman"; after 1982, this translation was changed to "President", although the Chinese title remains unchanged. In March 2018, presidential term limits were abolished.

State Council 

The State Council is the chief authority of the People's Republic of China. It is appointed by the National People's Congress and is chaired by the Premier of China and includes the heads of each governmental department and agency. There are about 50 members in the council. In the politics of the People's Republic of China, the Central People's Government forms one of three interlocking branches of power, the others being the Chinese Communist Party and the People's Liberation Army. The State Council directly oversees the various subordinate People's Governments in the provinces, and in practice maintains an interlocking membership with the top levels of the CCP.

Currently the Premier of the State Council is Li Qiang and the Vice Premiers are Han Zheng, Sun Chunlan, Hu Chunhua and Liu He. Together with the five State Councilors, they form the inner cabinet that regularly convenes for the State Council Executive Meeting.

Central Military Commission 

The Central Military Commission (CMC) exercises the command and control of the People's Liberation Army (PLA) and is supervised by the Standing Committee of the National People's Congress. It is nominally considered the supreme military policy-making body and its chairman, elected by the National People's Congress. Actual command and control of the PLA resides with the Central Military Commission of the CCP Central Committee.

The commission is headed by the CMC Chairman, who is also the commander-in-chief of the national armed forces including the People's Liberation Army (PLA), the People's Armed Police (PAP), and the Militia.

Currently, the chairman of the Central Military Commission is Xi Jinping.

National Supervisory Commission 

The National Supervisory Commission (NSC) is the highest supervisory (anti-corruption) agency of the PRC. At the same administrative ranking as the Supreme People's Court and Supreme People's Procuratorate, it supervises all public officials who exercise public power. Its operations are merged with the Central Commission for Discipline Inspection of the CCP. It replaced the former Ministry of Supervision. Currently the director of National Supervisory Commission is Liu Jinguo.

Supreme People's Court and Supreme People's Procuratorate 

The Supreme People's Court is the judicial organ of the People's Republic of China. Hong Kong and Macau, as special administrative regions, have separate judicial systems based on British common law traditions and Portuguese civil-law traditions respectively, and are out of the jurisdiction of the Supreme People's Court. The judges of the Supreme People's Court are appointed by the National People's Congress.

, the President of SPC and the Procurator-General of SPP are Zhang Jun and Ying Yong, respectively.

Provincial and local government 

The governors of China's provinces and autonomous regions and mayors of its centrally controlled municipalities are appointed by the central government in Beijing after receiving the nominal consent of the National People's Congress (NPC). The Hong Kong and Macau special administrative regions (SARS) have some local autonomy since they have separate governments, legal systems, and basic constitutional laws, but they come under Beijing's control in matters of foreign policy and national security, and their chief executives are handpicked by the central government.

Below the provincial level in 2004 there were 50 rural prefectures, 283 prefecture-level cities, 374 county-level cities, 852 county-level districts under the jurisdiction of nearby cities, and 1,636 counties. There also were 662 cities (including those incorporated into the four centrally controlled municipalities), 808 urban districts, and 43,258 township-level regions.

Counties are divided into townships and villages. While most are run by appointed officials, some lower-level jurisdictions have direct popular elections. The organs of self-governing ethnic autonomous areas (regions, prefectures, and counties)—peoples' congresses and peoples' governments—exercise the same powers as their provincial-level counterparts but are guided additionally by the Law on Regional Ethnic Autonomy and require NPC Standing Committee approval for regulations they enact "in the exercise of autonomy" and "in light of the political, economic, and cultural characteristics of the ethnic group or ethnic groups in the areas."

While operating under strict control and supervision by the central government, China's local governments manage relatively high share of fiscal revenues and expenditures.

Civil service

See also 
 Central People's Government (1949–54)
 Five Yuans of the Republic of China
 History of political parties in China
 Political systems of Imperial China
 Politics of the People's Republic of China
 Elections in China
 Orders of precedence in China

Notes

References

Citations

Sources

External links 
  

 
Asian governments